Lugard is a 2021 Nigerian action movie written by Laduba Quadri Qidad and Segun Akejeje. The movie was directed by Tunde Olaoye, produced by Hakeem Olageshin and released under the production studio of 3 Knights Film Production in conjunction with B5Films and Monomania Entertainment. The movie stars Gabriel Afolayan, Kehinde Bankole, Debo Macaroni, Omowunmi Dada, Adeniyi Johnson, Chinyere Wilfred, Nobert Young, Zack Orji and Kalu Ikeagwu.

Synopsis 
An intelligent student at the university was forceful dragged into cultism because of his talent. It became complicated when his first assignment led to the death of the rival gang's leader and he had to battle with his life and study through the film.

Premiere 
The movie was premiered on the  22 August 2021 and was screened in cinemas across the country on the 27 August 2021.

Cast   

 Abiodun Adebanjo
 Adebowale 'Debo' Adebayo 
 Gabriel Afolayan
 Kehinde Bankole
 Omowunmi Dada
 Kalu Ikeagwu
 Adeniyi Johnson
 Yomi Olorunlolaye
 Zack Orji
 Hafiz Oyetoro
 Quadri Qidad
 Rotimi Salami
 Yinka Salau
 Jsmile Uhuru
 Chinyere Wilfred
 Norbert Young

External links

References 

2021 films
Nigerian action drama films
English-language Nigerian films
2021 action drama films